Exit Wound is the fourth studio album by Trust Obey, self-released on in 1990. The album has two versions of a song "Fist Fuck", written in 1998 as part composer John Bergin's Orifice project. The themes of the music include gun violence, sex and relationships.

Reception
Factsheet Five compared the music Exit Wound favorably to Big Black and said "these songs seem more observational, almost voyeuristic in intent"

Track listing

Personnel
Adapted from the Exit Wound liner notes.

Trust Obey
 John Bergin – instruments

Release history

References

External links 
 Exit Wound at Discogs (list of releases)

1990 albums
Trust Obey albums